The Danube Program was a secret Romanian project to develop their own nuclear weapons. The project began in 1981, and lasted until 1989.

History
In 1970 the Socialist Republic of Romania ratified the Nuclear Non-Proliferation Treaty, which banned them from developing and building their own nuclear weapons. However, from 1981 until 1989, Romania had a nuclear weapons program,  including plutonium extraction
facilities. In 1992, after the Romanian Revolution, the new government reported the infraction to the International Atomic Energy Agency voluntarily, who then reported it to the UN Security Council.

Materials
Romania acquired Highly Enriched Uranium (HEU) from United States of America's Atoms for Peace program, which gave highly enriched uranium to many countries. The project made use of a nuclear reactor, that had been given to them by the United States, to create plutonium from the HEU. Although the project succeeded in creating plutonium, it did not actually construct any nuclear bombs, although it is estimated that with the materials the project had, they could have made up to 240 plutonium bombs, assuming that  of plutonium would be used for every bomb.

See also
 Romania and weapons of mass destruction

References

1981 establishments in Romania
1989 disestablishments in Romania
Secret military programs
Nuclear weapons programs
Socialist Republic of Romania
Nicolae Ceaușescu